Photostomias is a genus of barbeled dragonfishes.

Species
There are currently six recognized species in this genus:
 Photostomias atrox (Alcock, 1890)
 Photostomias goodyeari Kenaley & Hartel, 2005
 Photostomias guernei Collett, 1889
 Photostomias liemi Kenaley, 2009
 Photostomias lucingens Kenaley, 2009
 Photostomias tantillux Kenaley, 2009

References

Stomiidae
Taxa named by Robert Collett
Marine fish genera
Ray-finned fish genera